Kofi Brako is a Ghanaian politician and member of the Seventh Parliament of the Fourth Republic of Ghana representing the Tema Central Constituency in the Greater Accra Region on the ticket of the New Patriotic Party.

Early life and education
Brako was born on 11 September 1959. He hails from Akyem Bieni in the Eastern Region of Ghana. He obtained his Diploma in Freight Forwarding from Zurich, Switzerland in 2013.

Career
Prior to entering politics, Brako was the chief executive officer of Teamwork Freight Services in Tema.

Politics
Brako entered parliament on 7 January 2013 on the ticket of the New Patriotic Party representing the Tema Central Constituency. Out of the 41,581 valid votes cast, he polled 28,334 votes (68.31%%) to win the seat. He was re-elected in 2016 to remain in parliament for another four (4)-year term.

In parliament, he has served on various committees, some of which include; the Roads and Transport Committee, the Gender and Children Committee, and the Youth, Sports and Culture Committee.

Personal life
Brako is married with four children.
He identifies as a Christian and a member of the Church of Jesus Christ of Latter-day Saints.

References

Ghanaian MPs 2017–2021
New Patriotic Party politicians
1959 births
Living people
Ghanaian Latter Day Saints